Anna Sobol-Wejman (born 1946) is a Polish printmaker.

In 1985 she led workshops at the Academy of Fine Arts in Reykjavik, and from 1986 until 1990 she managed the Teatr Stu Gallery in Kraków. She has exhibited her work both at home and abroad, and has won a number of prizes during her career. In her work she favors a variety of techniques, including etching, aquatint, and lithography.

Sobol-Wejman's print Cloak Room I of 1997 is owned by the National Gallery of Art in Washington, D.C. Her work is also in the Museum of Modern Art, and the Minneapolis Institute of Art.

References

1946 births
Living people
20th-century printmakers
20th-century Polish women artists
21st-century printmakers
21st-century Polish women artists
Jan Matejko Academy of Fine Arts alumni
Polish printmakers
Women printmakers